Narlı is a village in the Çukurca District in Hakkâri Province in Turkey. The village is populated by Kurds of the Pinyanişî tribe and had a population of 268 in 2022.

The hamlets of Bulutlu, Güllüce and Taşlık are attached to Narlı. Only Kaynaklı is populated.

Population 
Population history of the village from 2007 to 2022:

References 

Villages in Çukurca District
Kurdish settlements in Hakkâri Province